John Cotton Burton (March 12, 1923 – December 5, 2014) was an American cross-country skier who competed in the 1950s. He finished 67th in the 18 km event at the 1952 Winter Olympics in Oslo. He was born in Minneapolis, Minnesota. Burton was a Harvard University graduate, playing ice hockey while a student. After serving in the United States Navy, he enrolled in the University of Minnesota Law School. While at Minnesota, Burton picked up cross-country skiing and made the US Ski Team for the 1952 games in Oslo. He later became a financial investor and later an educator.

References
18 km Olympic cross country results: 1948-52
John C. Burton's profile at Sports Reference.com
John C. Burton's obituary

1923 births
2014 deaths
American male cross-country skiers
American men's ice hockey players
Cross-country skiers at the 1952 Winter Olympics
Harvard University alumni
Ice hockey people from Minneapolis
Olympic cross-country skiers of the United States
United States Navy sailors
University of Minnesota Law School alumni
Skiers from Minneapolis
United States Navy personnel of World War II
Educators from Minnesota
20th-century American lawyers